The 46th government of Turkey (December 21, 1987 – November 9, 1989) was a government in the history of Turkey. It is also known as the second Özal government.

Background 
Motherland Party (ANAP) won the elections held on November 29, 1987. Turgut Özal, the leader of ANAP, who was also the prime minister of the previous government, founded the government.

The government

In the list below, the serving period of cabinet members who served only a part of the cabinet's lifespan are shown in the column "Notes".

Aftermath
On 31 October 1989, Turgut Özal was elected the president of Turkey. According to the constitution, he left the office of prime minister. After a brief period during which Ali Bozer was the acting prime minister, the new government was founded by Yıldırım Akbulut.

Notes

References

Cabinets of Turkey
Motherland Party (Turkey) politicians
1987 establishments in Turkey
1989 disestablishments in Turkey
Cabinets established in 1987
Cabinets disestablished in 1989
Members of the 46th government of Turkey
16th parliament of Turkey
Motherland Party (Turkey)